Cheesy is a platform game developed by British studio CTA Developments and published by Ocean Software in Europe for the PlayStation in November 1996.

Gameplay 

Cheesy is a platform game with 3D and 2.5D gameplay styles where the player controls the titular character, who was imprisoned in a castle by a mad scientist until aliens appear and try to attack him, with the main objective of the game being to escape from the castle, while battling against aliens that come in his way.

Development and release
Cheesy originally started as a project intended for the Atari Jaguar, which was first announced in 1994 as one of the upcoming titles for the Jaguar by Ocean Software and was originally scheduled to be released around the fourth quarter of 1995, however, the game was moved to the PlayStation after the system was a commercial and critical failure. The music was done by Zero-5 composers Dave Newman and James Veal. Cheesy was first showcased to the public at various trade shows such as E3 1996, before being released in Europe by Ocean in November 1996, and was later published in Japan by Jaleco on 24 July 1997.

Reception 

Cheesy received mixed to negative reviews from critics since its release. The game was cited for its controls, graphics and inconsistent game design, but the soundtrack received praise.

References

External links 

 Cheesy at MobyGames

1996 video games
3D platform games
Action video games
Cancelled Atari Jaguar games
Ocean Software games
Platform games
PlayStation (console) games
PlayStation (console)-only games
Single-player video games
Video games scored by Dave Newman
Video games scored by James Veal
Video games with 2.5D graphics
Jaleco games
Video games developed in the United Kingdom